
Doddington is a village and civil parish lying just off the A141 in the Isle of Ely,  Cambridgeshire, approximately half way between Chatteris (to the south) and March (to the north)

History 

St Mary's Church, Doddington is a  Grade II* listed building. Historically, Doddington was one of the largest parishes in England. Under the Doddington Rectory Division Act of 1856 it was divided into seven rectories, Benwick, Doddington, Wimblington, March Old Town, March St Peter, March St John and March St Mary. Doddington Hall, a private house, replaced the old Rectory in 1872.

A clocktower was built in 1897 to commemorate the Diamond Jubilee of Queen Victoria, and is in the centre of the village.

Local government 
The lowest level is Doddington Parish Council which has nine councillors, the village is in the two-seat 'Doddington and Wimblington' ward of Fenland District Council.

Community 
Doddington has almost 1,000 dwellings. The population of the civil parish at the time of the 2011 census was 2,181.

Local amenities include The Three Tuns and The George public houses, a post office, a few shops, a fish & chip fast food outlet, ladies and gents hairdressers, a GP's surgery and an NHS minor injuries unit (MIU). There are two churches, St Mary's Church of England parish church and a Methodist Chapel, and also a war memorial.

Doddington has a village hall, and two sports fields, one with a pavilion containing changing rooms, catering facilities and multi-purpose room. It has a Girlguiding unit, Scout troop, a Women's Institute, the women's section of the Royal British Legion, a short mat bowls club, outdoor bowls club, cricket club, football teams, and an under 5's group. The village holds the Doddington Village Sports and Carnival on the first Saturday in July which includes a children's sports event.

Notable people 
 Christopher Tye, composer and organist, was rector here after taking holy orders.
 Jonnie Peacock, MBE, sprinter who won gold at the 2012 Summer Paralympics.

References

External links

Villages in Cambridgeshire
Civil parishes in Cambridgeshire
Fenland District